The Shockoe Hill African Burying Ground (Richmond's 2nd African Burial Ground) was established by the city of Richmond, Virginia, for the interment of free people of color, and the enslaved. The heart of this now invisible burying ground is located at 1305 N 5th St. 

It was created as the replacement for the Burial Ground for Negroes, now also called the Shockoe Bottom African Burial Ground, (or African Burial Ground in Shockoe Bottom). Shockoe Bottom was known historically as Shockoe Valley. The Burial Ground for Negroes was closed in 1816 upon the opening of this new African Burying Ground on Shockoe Hill. The Shockoe Hill African Burying Ground is one of Virginia's most endangered historic places. Major threats to the burial ground are the DC2RVA high-speed rail project, the east-west Commonwealth Corridor, as well as the proposed widening of I-64, and various infrastructure projects.

History

Establishment
The Shockoe Hill African Burying Ground was established in 1816.  It was a segregated part of the Shockoe Hill Burying Ground, also known as the Shockoe Hill Cemetery, a municipal burying ground owned and operated by the City of Richmond.  It was managed by the Superintendent of the Shockoe Hill Burying Ground, who was also the Superintendent of the Poorhouse (with the exception of the years 1863-1867 during which time the positions were separated) and the City Hospital The Poorhouse was also called the Almshouse. The burial ground was overseen by the Shockoe Hill Burying Ground Committee, which was a standing committee of the Richmond City Council. The African Burying Ground was active from its opening in February of 1816 until its closure by the city due to overcrowded conditions in June of 1879.  The land that comprises this long unacknowledged burial ground, contains nothing on its surface that would cause it to be visibly recognizable as a cemetery today.  Its original two one acre plots are located at the northeastern corner of 5th and Hospital St., across the road from the Hebrew Cemetery.  It was greatly increased in size over time, expanding in every direction.  By 1850 its grounds encompassed as many as 15 acres. Later maps indicate an even greater expansion, to slightly over 31 acres.

Maps
In the 1870s it came to be labeled on maps as Potter's Field, until it last appeared in 1905. The 1905 map showed that it extended west behind The Almshouse to 2nd St, and north to the Bacon's Quarter Branch. Some maps show it extending to the east almost as far as 8th St. Earlier maps show it by various names.  On the 1816 Plan of the City of Richmond Property, the two one-acre plots were labeled "Burying Ground for Free People of Colour", and the "Burying Ground for Negroes". On the 1817 Map of the City of Richmond, it appears as the "Free People of Colour's B.G." and "Negro(e's) B.G.".  The 1835 Plan of the City of Richmond has it recorded as the "Grave Yard for Free People of Colour" and "For Slaves". On that map the burying ground for slaves had been increased by about 1.3 additional acres. The 1842 Bates Map depicts it as "The Burying Ground for Coloured Persons" and "the Burying Ground for Slaves". On the 1849 Plan of Richmond, it is referred to as one place, and was called the "Burying-ground for Coloured Persons". In 1850 the Common Council increased the burying-ground for colored persons by 9 acres in addition to the grounds of the City Hospital.  On the 1853 Smith's Map of Henrico County, Virginia, it appears twice.  On the county portion of the map it appears under the "Shockoe Hill Burying Ground". On the separate city of Richmond portion of the map it appears as the "African Burying Ground".    On the 1856 Map of the city of Richmond, Henrico County, the entire burying ground (black and white) appears under one name, without the additional labels showing its segregated status. Though still segregated, it appears simply as the "Shockoe Hill Burying Ground".  This is also the name under which it appears in the majority of records, such as interment reports. It is also true for some maps from the 1860s. However; it is from the combination of the two names under which it appears on the 1853 Map that the name "Shockoe Hill African Burying Ground" was derived.

City Hospital grounds
During the Civil War, the bodies of more than 500 deceased Union Army Prisoners of War were interred in the Shockoe Hill African Burying Ground.  Shortly after the war their remains were removed from the African Burying Ground and then re-interred in the Richmond National Cemetery.  The majority of the soldiers had been buried to the north, and to the east of the City Hospital (for smallpox).  Interments were also made in the vicinity of the Poorhouse.  It was reported that 428 soldiers were removed from the City Hospital, and 128 from the vicinity of the Poorhouse. The City Hospital building was converted into the Colored Almshouse, which then opened its doors in April of 1868.  The City Hospital was included on the 1842 Bates Map, and may have been constructed about that time. It was located directly to the east of the walled Shockoe Hill Cemetery. Its grounds were added to the African Burying Ground by the City Council in 1850. The 1816 plan of the city property shows that the northern grounds of the hospital were already in use for the interment of paupers who had died at the Poorhouse, both black and white. This early part of the burial ground extended across present day N 4th St.

Desecrations
This burying ground has suffered many atrocities.  Throughout its years of operation, it was a main target for body snatching by and for the medical colleges, especially the Medical College of Virginia and the University of Virginia.  It suffered from the explosion of a gun powder magazine on April 3, 1865, and the later construction of 2 new powder magazines built upon it in 1867. Its grounds were disposed of by the city of Richmond.  Portions of it became part of the Hebrew Cemetery. In addition, it has had roads, a railway, and the highway run through it.  An old Sunoco gas station sits upon a portion of its original 2 acres, along with a billboard; while other parts lie beneath Interstate-64, 4th St., 5th St., 7th St. Hospital St. and also the railroad tracks. The list of abuses does not stop there, and the site remains threatened to this day.  Three approaching threats to the burial ground are DC2RVA passenger rail (high-speed rail), the east-west Commonwealth Corridor, and the proposed widening of I-64. These transportation projects will directly impact the Shockoe Hill African Burying Ground. Various infrastructure projects have impacted this site, and continue to be constant threats. The most recent appearing to be underground cables installed in the burial ground in the area of Hospital St. and 7th St. in early 2022.

One of the newest threats to the Shockoe Hill African Burying Ground is confusion, and miss-identification. In the fall of 2022 the Shockoe Hill African Burying Ground was completely confused in the media with the African Burial Ground in Shockoe Bottom. It was reported multiple times that the Shockoe Hill African Burying Ground was the burial ground located next to the Lumpkin's Jail. And the histories of the two burial grounds were intertwined. Historically, it is the Shockoe Hill African Burying Ground, that was the active municipal burial ground for the city of Richmond for enslaved people (and free people of color) during the time that the Lumpkin's Jail was in operation. But physically, it is the older African Burial Ground in Shockoe Bottom that closed in 1816 that was/is located next to the Lumpkin's Slave Jail. It is important to understand and remember that the city of Richmond has two African Burial Grounds. Both of the burial grounds are important, and each deserves to be seen, accurately known and understood.

Estimations
Reports of interments were regularly made and submitted to the Richmond City Council by the Superintendent of the Shockoe Hill Burying Ground.  It is estimated that over 22,000 interments were made in the Shockoe Hill African Burying Ground, likely making it the largest burial ground of free people of color and the enslaved in the United States.  It is presently referred to by some as the 2nd African Burial Ground or second African Burying Ground, and African Burial Ground II.

Developments
Recent advocacy led by a descendant of people interred at the Shockoe Hill African Burying Ground, resulted in gaining the support of the city of Richmond.  In 2020, Mayor Levar Stoney and his administration sponsored two important ordinances regarding the burial ground. Ordinance #2020-213 added the property at 1305 N 5th St. to the Richmond Slave Trail, and provided for the funding of its intended acquisition.  Ordinance #2020-240 paved the way for the purchase of the property.  Both ordinances were presented before the Richmond City Council who passed them with unanimous support.  Though 1305 N. 5th St. is only a small portion of the Shockoe Hill African Burying Ground, it is a significant part.  It is 1.2 acres of the original 2 acre 1816 burial ground.  More specifically, it is roughly 0.80 acres of the "Burying Ground for Free People of Colour", and about 0.40 acres of the "Burying Ground for Negroes" (enslaved). On February 17, 2021 the city of Richmond successfully bid on 1305 N. 5th St. at a property tax sale.  On April 16, 2021 the acquisition of 1305 N. 5th St. was completed. 

Other developments:

September 17, 2020 – a Preliminary Information Form (P.I.F.) was presented before the Virginia State Review Board, seeking approval to write the nomination for the Shockoe Hill Burying Ground Historic District for listing in the Virginia Landmarks Register (VLR) and the National Register of Historic Places (NRHP). The P.I.F received the board's unanimous approval, making the historic district eligible for nomination. 

May 11, 2021 – Preservation Virginia, named the Shockoe Hill African Burying Ground, one of Virginia's Most Endangered Historic Places. 

June 17, 2021 – a proposal was presented to the Virginia Board of Historic Resources for an Historical Highway Marker for the Shockoe Hill African Burying Ground. It was unanimously approved.

July 2,2021 – the CSX right-of-way over the Shockoe Hill African Burying Ground was divided, and the northern half and eastern half were transferred to Virginia Passenger Rail Authority (VPRA).

July 28, 2021 – the completed nomination for the Shockoe Hill Burying Ground Historic District was submitted to the Virginia Department of Historic Resources (DHR), seeking inclusion in the Virginia Landmarks Register (VR) and the National Register of Historic Places (NRHP).  The Shockoe Hill African Burying Ground is a part of the historic district.

September 2, 2021 – The Society For American Archaeology publicly published its letter of support for the Shockoe Hill Burying Ground Historic District's nomination to the National Register of Historic Places.

October 20, 2021 – at the CTB Rail and Transit Subcommittee Meeting, it was announced by the Chair Jennifer Mitchell that the DC2RVA, Section 106 Process: Federal Railroad Administration (FRA) was reopening the National Historic Preservation Act Section 106 consultation process for the DC to Richmond High Speed Rail (DC2RVA). This was due in part to the presence of a "new National Register of Historic Places (NRHP) eligible resources in the area of potential effects (APE), the Shockoe Hill Burying Ground Historic District (127-7231), and one resource with expanded boundaries, the
Shockoe Hill African Burying Ground (44HE1203)."

December 2021 – The Cultural Landscape Foundation featured the Shockoe Hill African Burying Ground in its online exhibition, Landslide 2021: Race and Space. This exhibition features nationally significant cultural landscapes that are associated with African Americans, Hispanic Americans, and Native peoples that are threatened and at-risk.

February 17, 2022 – Congressman Donald McEachin and Senator Tim Kaine support the nomination for the Shockoe Hill Burying Ground Historic District (which includes the Shockoe Hill African Burying Ground) to the National Register of Historic Places.

February 22, 2022 – city of Richmond Mayor Levar Stoney submitted his letter of support to the Julie Langan, Director of the Virginia Department of Historic Resources, for the nomination of the Shockoe Hill Burying Ground Historic District to the Virginia State Landmarks Register and the National Register of Historic Places.

March 17, 2022 – The Shockoe Hill Burying Ground Historic District was added to the Virginia Landmarks Register. The nomination received the unanimous support of the Virginia Board of Historic Resources and the State Review Board.

May 7, 2022 – the National Park Service received the nomination for the Shockoe Hill Burying Ground Historic District to the National Register of Historic Places.

June 12, 2022 – the Historic Highway Marker for the Shockoe Hill African Burying Ground was unveiled at 1305 N 5th St. The marker was sponsored by the Virginia Department of Historic Resources.

June 16, 2022 – the Shockoe Hill Burying Ground Historic District (127-7231) was added to the National Register of Historic Places.

January 2023 – the city of Richmond was gifted two parcels of land by Sauer Properties Inc. located at 1241 and 1220 N 7th St. One parcel contains a portion of the Shockoe Hill African Burying Ground, and the other parcel is adjoining.

January 20, 2023 - the Federal Railroad Administration (FRA) determined that the DC2RVA high-speed rail project would have an adverse effect on the Shockoe Hill African Burying Ground and the Shockoe Hill Burying Ground Historic District. 

February 1, 2023, the Virginia Department of Historic Resources (DHR) agreed with the FRA's adverse effect determination.

References

External links
 
 Sacred Ground Historical Reclamation Project: Shockoe Hill African Burial Ground
 Wikimapia, Shockoe Hill African Burying Ground
 PRELIMINARY INFORMATION FORM (PIF) for HISTORIC DISTRICTS, "Shockoe Hill Burying Ground" (127-7231)
 The Black Cemetery Network
 Preservation Virginia – Virginia’s Most Endangered Historic Places List 2021
 African American Heritage Sites: African American Endangered Historic Sites Places – Shockoe Hill African Burying Ground
 Sacred Spaces: Preserving African American Cemeteries
 Dead Reckoning: The Historical Recovery and Unsettled Place of Richmond's Shockoe Hill African Burying Ground – The 2021 Elske v.P. Smith Lecture featuring Ryan K. Smith, Professor in the Department of History
 Landslide 2021: Race and Space: Hidden Histories Revealed,THE CULTURAL LANDSCAPE FOUNDATION, Shockoe Hill African Burying Ground
 Feature Stories, THE CULTURAL LANDSCAPE FOUNDATION: National Attention for Shockoe Hill African Burying Ground
 THE CULTURAL LANDSCAPE FOUNDATION: It’s Not OK to Put High Speed Rail Lines Through the Shockoe Hill African Burying Ground
 NBC News: The growing movement to save black cemeteries
 Sapiens: At the Heart of It All
 Richmond Times Dispatch – Keep Black history visible and viable, by Michael Paul William, 02/23/2022
 SAPIENS: Talk Back Episode 3
 National Trust for Historic Preservation – Preserving Sacred Ground: Shockoe Hill African Burying Ground
 Richmond Cemeteries: A moment to celebrate for Shockoe Hill
 Richmond Times-Dispatch: Shockoe Hill African Burying Ground is added to the state landmark registry, 3/18/2022
 March 18, 2022: Check out A1 Minute NOW – Shockoe Hill African Burying Ground is VA landmark
 VCU News, March 18, 2022, "Long-neglected Black cemetery in Richmond added to Virginia Landmarks Register", by Brian McNeill
 Historic Richmond: Shockoe Hill Burying Ground Historic District
 THE CULTURAL LANDSCAPE FOUNDATION: Shockoe Hill African Burying Ground is Now a VA Landmark
 Radio IQ WVTF – Shockoe Hill African Burying Ground in Richmond gets landmark designation
 DHR Virginia Department of Historic Resources, 127-7231 Shockoe Hill Burying Ground Historic District
 The News & Advance – 'It’s a good beginning' – Historical marker placed at Shockoe Hill African Burying Ground, June 12, 2022
 VPM npr news – African burying ground historical marker unveiled in Richmond, June 13, 2022
 VCU News, June 14, 2022, "State marker unveiled at Shockoe Hill African Burying Ground" by Allen Jones
 CBS Mornings – Descendant works to reclaim Virginia African American burial ground
 National Register of Historic Places Weekly List 2022 06 17
 Richmond Cemeteries, The Crest of Shockoe Hill, by Ryan K. Smith
 Washington Post, October 28, 2022 "Where’s Kitty Cary? The answer unlocked Black history Richmond tried to hide." by Gregory S. Schneider
 Richmond Times-Dispatch: Richmond gets land for Burying Ground trail, by David Ress, 1/09/2023
 Willis, Samantha, Virginia Mercury " Once a dead end, a Richmond cemetery earns new respect". January 30, 2023
 Lazarus, Jeremy M., Richmond Free Press, "Rail agency begins historic cemetery review for estimated 22,000 souls", February 2, 2023
Williams, Michael Paul, Richmond Times-Dispatch, "At any speed, we don't need a train station in Shockoe Bottom", February 22, 2023 

Cemeteries in Richmond, Virginia
African-American cemeteries in Virginia
African-American history in Richmond, Virginia
History of slavery in Virginia
National Register of Historic Places in Richmond, Virginia
Richmond

Cemeteries on the National Register of Historic Places in Virginia